The Derek Hines Unsung Hero Award is an annual award given out to the NCAA Division I player judged to best exemplify the qualities of sportsmanship, competitiveness, intelligence and work ethic. The award is named in honor of Derek Hines, a 4-year letter-winner for Army who was killed while serving in Afghanistan on September 1, 2005.

Winners

Winners by school

Winners by position

References

College sports freshman awards

Ice Hockey National Rookie of the Year
NCAA Division I ice hockey
Yale Bulldogs men's ice hockey